Rainy Creek is a stream in Benton and Camden Counties in the U.S. state of Missouri. It is a tributary of the Osage River within the waters of the Lake of the Ozarks.

The stream flows west past the north side of Climax Springs. The stream turns northwest and enters Benton County briefly before turning to the northeast and re-entering Camden County. The stream enters an arm of the Lake of the Ozarks (at ) at an elevation of 629 feet.

Rainy Creek derives its name from a settler named Rainey.

See also
List of rivers of Missouri

References

Rivers of Benton County, Missouri
Rivers of Camden County, Missouri
Rivers of Missouri